Henry McBride may refer to:

 Henry McBride (politician) (1856–1937), governor of Washington
 Henry McBride (art critic) (1867–1962), American art critic